The Catholic Church in the Nordic countries was the only Christian church in that region before the Reformation in the 16th century. Since then, Scandinavia has been a mostly non-Catholic (Lutheran) region and the position of Nordic Catholics for many centuries after the Reformation was very difficult due to legislation outlawing Catholicism. However, the Catholic population of the Nordic countries has seen some growth in the region in recent years, particularly in Norway, in large part due to immigration and to a lesser extent conversions among the native population.

History

In Sweden, a patent letter of tolerance rescinded anti-Catholic laws and Catholics were once again allowed to settle and practice their religion in 1781 under Gustavus III. The Vicariate Apostolic of Sweden was founded in 1783. It was elevated to a diocese in 1953.

The Norwegian Constitution of 1814 denied Jews and Catholics (particularly Jesuits) entrance in Norway. It also stated that attendance in a Lutheran church was compulsory. The ban on Catholics was lifted in 1842, and the ban on Jews was lifted in 1851. At first, there were multiple restrictions on the practice of Catholicism; only foreign citizens were allowed to practice, and after the first post-reformation parish was founded in 1843, Catholics were only allowed to celebrate Mass in this one parish. In 1845, with the passing of the Dissenter Act, most restrictions on non-Lutheran Christian denominations were lifted, and Catholics were now allowed to practice their religion freely and invite most religious orders to settle in the country. However, members of the Society of Jesus would not be allowed to enter Norway until 1956.

Notable Nordic Post-Reformation Catholics
Anders Arborelius is the first ethnically Swedish Catholic bishop (1998) since the Reformation and the first Swedish cardinal ever, convert
Count Nils Bielke (1706–1765), converted in Rome in 1731, and became a Roman senator and papal chamberlain, convert
Queen Christina of Sweden, convert
Saint Elizabeth Hesselblad (1870–1957), convert
Czeslaw Kozon, Bishop of Copenhagen 
Halldór Laxness, Icelandic novelist; winner of 1955 Nobel Prize for Literature
Janne Haaland Matláry, Norwegian international relations scholar, convert
Helena Nyblom (1843–1926), Danish-born Swedish writer, convert
Count Christopher de Paus (1862–1943), a Norwegian land owner who converted and became a papal chamberlain and Roman Count, convert
Baron Wilhelm Wedel-Jarlsberg (1852–1909), Norwegian nobleman and papal chamberlain, convert
Ven. Charles Schilling (1835–1907), Norwegian barnabite priest and candidate for canonization
Brita Collett Paus, the founder of Fransiskushjelpen, convert
Sven Stolpe
Queen Josephine (1807–1876), queen consort of Sweden and Norway
Ulf Ekman, former Word of life pastor and founder, convert
Jón Sveinsson, a Jesuit author from Iceland; wrote in Icelandic, but lived in France, convert
Olaf Thommessen, Oslo politician and businessman
Stian Berger Røsland, Oslo politician and former governing mayor of Oslo
Blessed Niels Steensen (1638–1686), Danish scientist and bishop
Birgitta Trotzig
Sigrid Undset (1882–1949), Norwegian writer, convert
Gunnel Vallquist (1918–2016), Swedish writer, critic and translator, former member of the Swedish Academy, convert
Johannes Jorgensen (1866–1956), Danish writer, biographer of Francis of Assisi

See also

Catholic Church in Sweden
Christianization of Scandinavia
Conventicle Act (Denmark–Norway)
Conventicle Act (Sweden)
Dissenter Acts (Sweden)
Lists of Roman Catholics
Northern Crusades
Reformation in Denmark–Norway and Holstein
Anti-Catholicism in Norway
Reformation in Sweden
Roman Catholicism in Denmark
Roman Catholicism in the Faroe Islands
Roman Catholicism in Finland
Roman Catholicism in Iceland
Roman Catholicism in Norway
Scandinavian colonialism

References

Catholicism-related controversies
Nordic
Scandinavian history
Christianity in Northern Europe